Two different races were known as the Carolina 200:

 ARCA Re/MAX Carolina 200, the spring ARCA Racing Series race at Rockingham Speedway in 1973 and in 2008-09
 Good Sam Roadside Assistance Carolina 200, the spring NASCAR Camping World Truck Series race at Rockingham Speedway from 2012 to present